The 2nd Guards Corps was a formation of the Imperial Russian Army that saw service in World War I. It was founded in November 1915 and disbanded in early 1918.

Composition
It participated in military operations on the South-Western (1915 - November 1916, April 1917 - 1918) and Western (November 1916 - April 1917) fronts.

Commanders
12/08/1915 - 05/27/1916 - General of Infantry Vladimir Apollonovich Olokhov
05/27/1916 - 04/02/1917 - Lieutenant General Georgy Ottonovich Rauch
04/02/1917 - 04/29/1917 - Major General Georgy Nikolaevich  Viranovsky (acting)
04/29/1917 - 08/19/1917 - Lieutenant General Georgy Nikolaevich Viranovsky
08/25/1917 - 04/1918 - Lieutenant General Vsevolod Vladimirovich Chernavin

References
 Русская армия в Великой войне: Картотека формирований

Literature
Zalessky K. A. The First World War. Rulers and Warlords: A Biographical Encyclopedic Dictionary. - M .: Veche, 2000 .-- 576 p. - (Military secrets of the XX century). - .
Military Encyclopedic Dictionary. M., Military Publishing House, 1984. Southwestern Front 1914-1917, p. 838

Corps of the Russian Empire
Military units and formations established in 1915
Military units and formations disestablished in 1918
Russian Imperial Guard